Harry Herbert Davies (9 June 1878 – 31 August 1957) was a Southern Rhodesian Labour politician and Leader of the Opposition in the territory's Legislative Assembly from 1929 to 1944. Originally from Wales, he moved to Southern Rhodesia in 1920 and became an estate agent in Bulawayo. He ran for the Southern Rhodesian Labour Party in Bulawayo District in the 1924 general election, but was not elected. After standing successfully in Bulawayo South in the 1928 election, he sat in the Southern Rhodesian Legislative Assembly for 20 years. In 1929 he was elected leader of the Southern Rhodesian Labour Party, thereby becoming Leader of the Opposition, a post he held until 1944.

Re-elected in Bulawayo South in the 1933 and 1934 elections, in 1939 Davies switched to the new Hillside constituency in southern Bulawayo, which he won, and held in 1946. On the outbreak of the Second World War he accepted the Prime Minister Godfrey Huggins's offer to come into a national government with ministers from both sides of the House, and served as Minister of Internal Affairs from 1939 to 1943. Davies's co-operation with Huggins infuriated many of his Labour contemporaries and caused an acrimonious split in the party. The two Labour factions reconciled in 1943 and briefly threatened Huggins's premiership, but a heated dispute over whether Labour should become multiracial led to the party's disintegration in 1944. Davies's political career ended after his defeat in Hillside by Julian Greenfield of Huggins's United Party in the 1948 general election. The former Labour leader died in Salisbury on 31 August 1957, at the age of 79.

References

1878 births
1957 deaths

People from Bulawayo
Rhodesian politicians
Members of the Legislative Assembly of Southern Rhodesia
White Rhodesian people

British emigrants to Southern Rhodesia